The Big Picture (French original title L'Homme qui voulait vivre sa vie – "The man who wanted to live his life") is a 2010 French psychological thriller directed by Éric Lartigau, and starring Romain Duris, Marina Foïs, Niels Arestrup and Catherine Deneuve. The story is adapted from the 1997 novel The Big Picture by Douglas Kennedy.

Synopsis
A successful Paris lawyer with a seemingly perfect life discovers that his wife is having an affair and accidentally kills her lover in a moment of madness. He escapes the law by faking his own death, assuming his victim's identity, and making a fresh start on the Adriatic coast as a photographer. This eventually leads him to realise what was missing in his life before: he finally sees the big picture.

Cast
 Romain Duris - Paul Exben
 Marina Foïs - Sarah Exben
 Niels Arestrup - Bartholomé
 Branka Katić - Ivana
 Catherine Deneuve - Anne
 Éric Ruf - Grégoire Kremer

Reception 
The film was critically praised. Review aggregation website Rotten Tomatoes gives the film a score of 88% based on reviews from 41 critics, with an average score of 7/10.

References

External links
 
  
 
 
 
 
 
 The Observer, 24 July 2011: The Big Picture — review Retrieved 2012-12-03
 Background article by Michel Guerrin on Antoine D'Agata's photography for the film, in Le Monde, 2 novembre 2010. [in French]

French psychological thriller films
2010 films
Films based on American novels
EuropaCorp films
2010s French films